Robert Cauer the Younger (3 January 1863, Bad Kreuznach - 28 February 1947, Darmstadt) was a German sculptor.

Life and work 
His father was the sculptor, Karl Cauer, who gave him his first lessons. Three of his brothers, Emil, Ludwig and Hugo (1864-1918) also became sculptors. In 1880, he made an extended study trip to Rome. From 1887 to 1889, he worked at the Cauer family studios there. By 1889, he was in the United States, in St. Louis, where his family had professional connections. There, he created portrait busts. 

He went back to Germany and, in 1902, was married. That same year, he created one of his largest works, the monument "Michel Mort und die Schlacht von Sprendlingen" in Bad Kreuznach. After another stay in St. Louis in 1904, he settled in Darmstadt and worked as a freelance sculptor; producing busts and reliefs for public and private clients, many with religious or symbolic themes.

In 1916, he was awarded the title of Professor by Grand Duke Ernst Ludwig, and became an honorary citizen of Hesse the following year.

A street in Darmstadt is named after him.

References

Further reading 
 Friedrich Back: "Cauer, Robert d. J." In: Ulrich Thieme (Ed.): Allgemeines Lexikon der Bildenden Künstler von der Antike bis zur Gegenwart, Vol. 6: Carlini–Cioci. E. A. Seemann, Leipzig 1912, pg.201 (Online)
 Robert Cauer der Jüngere, In: Saur – Allgemeines Künstler-Lexikon. Vol.17, K. G. Saur, München-Leipzig, 1997, pg.334
 Elke Masa: Die Bildhauerfamilie Cauer im 19. und 20. Jahrhundert. Neun Bildhauer aus vier Generationen – Emil Cauer d. Ä., Carl Cauer, Robert Cauer d. Ä., Robert Cauer d. J., Hugo Cauer, Ludwig Cauer, Emil Cauer d. J., Stanislaus Cauer, Hanna Cauer. Gebr. Mann, Berlin 1989,

External links 

 
 Entry on Robert Cauer @ the Rheinland-Pfälzische Personendatenbank

1863 births
1947 deaths
German sculptors
Busts (sculpture)
People from Bad Kreuznach